Maharaja Bir Chandra Manikya Bahadur of the Manikya Dynasty was the king of Tripura from 1862 to 1896.

Biography
Bir Chandra Manikya is regarded as the architect of modern Agartala city. In 1862, he started the urbanisation of the Agartala. In 1871 he established the Agartala Municipality. He established Umakanta Academy, the first western school in Tripura, in 1890.

An enthusiastic photographer, he was the first king in India to organize an annual photographic exhibition in his palace. More than 100 years after his death, the Maharaja's Foto ka Karkhana, a fully equipped studio, came to light in Madho Niwas, inside the palace.

Legacy
The Tagore family had links with the princes of Tripura since the time Dwarkanath Tagore but the relationship between the two families was closest during the time of Bir Chandra's reign. Rabindranath Tagore had a friendly relationship with the king. Three important works of Rabindranath Tagore — Mukuta (1885), Rajarshi, and Visarjana (1890) were directly influenced by his association with the royal family of Tripura. Bir Chandra Manikya was also one of the main characters of the novel Prathom Alo by Sunil Gangopadhyay.

See also
Manikya dynasty
Tripura (princely state)

References

External links
Kingdom of Tripura - University of Queensland

Kings of Tripura
History of Tripura
People from Agartala